The 1978–79 Notre Dame Fighting Irish men's basketball team represented the University of Notre Dame during the 1978–79 NCAA men's basketball season. The team was led by head coach Digger Phelps and played their home games at the Joyce Center.

After reaching the school's first Final Four the previous season, Notre Dame entered the season with high expectations and a No. 3 preseason ranking (AP). One of five teams to hold the No. 1 ranking during season, the Irish earned the #1 seed in the Mideast Region of the 1979 NCAA Tournament, but were defeated by eventual the eventual NCAA champions, Michigan State, in the regional final. Notre Dame finished the season with a record of 24–6.

Roster

Schedule and results

|-
!colspan=9 style=| Regular season

|-
!colspan=9 style=| NCAA Tournament

Rankings

^Coaches did not release Week 1 or Week 2 polls.

References

Notre Dame Fighting Irish men's basketball seasons
Notre Dame
Notre Dame
Notre Dame Fighting Irish
Notre Dame Fighting Irish